The Amityville Terror is a 2016 American horror film directed by Michael Angelo, and written by Amanda Barton. It was released direct-to-video, and is the sixteenth film to be inspired by Jay Anson's 1977 novel The Amityville Horror. Nicole Tompkins stars as Hailey Jacobson, the daughter of a dysfunctional family that is terrorized by both evil spirits and malicious townspeople after moving into a haunted house in Amityville, New York.

Plot 
Jessica and Todd Jacobson, along with their teenage daughter Hailey and troubled aunt Shae, move into a haunted house in Amityville. Shae unknowingly purchases this house from property manager Delilah McAllister. Hailey quickly meets a local teen, Brett, and they develop a relationship. Despite this, Hailey begins to be bullied by classmates Theresa, Sally, and Claire.

While in the bathtub, Shae feels a strange experience, as if her flesh was burning. Proving to be a hallucination, Shae's behavior continues to grow stranger. When relaying this peculiar behavior to Brett, Hailey is introduced to a story about a little boy who used to live in that house. The boy, named Jimmy Oberest, drowned his baby sister in acid before killing his parents.

Mike, Todd's mechanic boss, comes to visit, as he used to date Shae in college. He finds her hovering behind Jessica while holding a scalpel. After this encounter, Mike immediately goes to see Delilah, the property manager, begging her to spare Shae. Delilah refuses this. Later, Mike dies when Todd inadvertently starts a fire in the auto shop. During this, Jessica works in the garden, repeatedly cutting herself and covering her in blood.

Later on, Todd is seen at a bar. While there, Delilah appears and tries to seduce him. When Todd arrives home, he is strangely seduced by his wife, who is revealed to be Shae in a supernatural disguise. Hailey is introduced to Brett's friend Jenny. Jenny is said to be psychic and reluctantly decides to help Hailey and her family by going to their house to cleanse it. Jenny is supernaturally attacked and thrown out an upstairs window as she does so.

Hailey finds her aunt Shae painting with a scalpel from a bag belonging to Dr. Willis R. Cranston. Upon researching Dr. Cranston, Hailey discovers that he disappeared in 2004. Hailey decides to track down David, Willis's brother, who informs Hailey that his brother bought the house from Delilah. Upon finding this out, Hailey breaks into Delilah's home. She finds a file cabinet full of folders with names of the families who had rented the Amityville property and disappeared. Delilah finds Hailey, the latter fleeing to the police station to call her father, telling him to get her mother and aunt and leave. Hailey also calls Brett, informing him about Delilah. Brett reveals that the little boy he was talking about prior, along with his family, practiced black magic in the house. They had opened a portal to Hell. Delilah is uncovered to be Jimmy Oberest's sister, who was not home at the time of Jimmy's murders. Hailey sees two men transporting Jenny's body, cutting her conversation with Brett short in order to follow. Back at the house Shae, fully possessed, attacks Jessica inside the house. Meanwhile, Theresa and her friends confront Brett, badgering him about helping Hailey and getting Jenny involved.

Hailey follows the two men, coming upon a makeshift graveyard. There she notices a marker that is reserved with the Jacobson name. Theresa and her friends confront Hailey, revealing the town's nature and its people. She explains that the townspeople must feed the house, or the evil spirit inside will come after them. Hailey attacks Theresa and her friends, killing one of them while Theresa kills the other for disloyalty. Taunting Hailey, Theresa reveals she has decapitated Brett, which infuriates Hailey. Hailey fights Theresa off, stabbing her and returning to the house. Once home, Hailey finds her parents butchered as Shae leaps to attack her. Shae and Hailey fight, the latter defending herself as she flees around the home. Hailey eventually fires an arrow into Shae's forehead, causing her to combust. This allows Hailey to flee the house.

In the epilogue, Delilah is seen showing the house to the family seen killed in the prologue scene.

Cast

Release 

Uncork'd Entertainment released The Amityville Terror on video on demand on August 2, 2016 and on DVD on October 4, 2016.

Reception 

Tex Hula ranked The Amityville Terror as the tenth best out of the twenty-one Amityville films that he reviewed for Ain't It Cool News, and succinctly stated, "Just as bland and generic as you can possibly get. Boring characters. Sub-plots are introduced and quickly forgotten. But surprisingly it has more gore, sex, and nudity than any other Amityville movie. Doesn't help though." Brandon Long of PopHorror was highly critical of The Amityville Terror, calling it "a generic knockoff of the original film" before concluding, "The one redeemable element to this film is a few brutally creative death scenes paired with Aunt Shae's deteriorating sanity." Kieran Fisher, in a review written for Scream magazine, was similarly contemptuous of the film, finding it to be "the epitome of generic and forgettable" and deeming it something, "I'd only recommend to diehard fans of the franchise."

References

External links 

 
 

2016 direct-to-video films
2016 directorial debut films
2016 drama films
2016 films
2016 horror films
2016 independent films
2010s exploitation films
2010s ghost films
2010s high school films
2010s horror drama films
2010s mystery drama films
2010s psychological drama films
2010s psychological horror films
2010s supernatural horror films
2010s teen drama films
2010s teen horror films
Adultery in films
American direct-to-video films
American exploitation films
American ghost films
American haunted house films
American high school films
American horror drama films
American independent films
American mystery drama films
American psychological drama films
American psychological horror films
American sequel films
American supernatural drama films
American supernatural horror films
American teen drama films
American teen horror films
Amityville Horror films
Demons in film
Direct-to-video drama films
Direct-to-video horror films
Direct-to-video sequel films
Fiction about familicide
Films about alcoholism
Films about bullying
Films about cults
Films about dysfunctional families
Films about fictional painters
Films about human sacrifice
Films about landlords
Films about mass murder
Films about shapeshifting
Films about spirit possession
Films about substance abuse
Films about witchcraft
Films set in 2015
Films set in forests
Films set in Long Island
Films set in New York (state)
Films shot in California
Films shot in Los Angeles County, California
Incest in film
Murder mystery films
Mystery horror films
Teen mystery films
Unofficial sequel films
2010s English-language films
2010s American films